Franklyn Anthony Dennis (born 26 September 1947, in Jamaica) is a former cricketer for Canada. He played three One Day Internationals in the 1979 World Cup, as well as appearing for the country in the 1979 ICC Trophy tournament. In the World Cup, in the match against England at Old Trafford, he scored 21 out of the team's total of 45 all out; none of his team-mates made more than five.

He was the second player in ICC Cricket World Cup history after Roy Fredericks to be dismissed hit wicket.

References

External links

Statistical summary from CricketArchive

Canadian cricketers
Canada One Day International cricketers
Living people
Jamaican emigrants to Canada
1947 births
Jamaican cricketers
Canadian cricket coaches
Jamaican cricket coaches